Tokugawa Nariaki (徳川 斉昭, April 4, 1800 – September 29, 1860) was a prominent Japanese daimyō who ruled the Mito Domain (now Ibaraki Prefecture) and contributed to the rise of nationalism and the Meiji Restoration.

Biography

Clan leader 
Nariaki was the 3rd son of Tokugawa Harutoshi, the seventh-generation daimyō of Mito. The family headship first passed to Harutoshi's eldest son Narinobu, before being passed on to Nariaki in 1829.
Nariaki was also leader of the Jōi (expel the barbarian) party and made a Bakufu adviser on national defence. His childhood name was Torasaburo (虎三郎) later changed to Keisaburo (敬三郎).

Bakufu official 
Nariaki was put in charge of Bakufu efforts to defend the country against encroaching foreigners. His own view was that the bakufu should strengthen its military and fight the foreigners, and was at odds with Ii Naosuke on the issue. He was pro-emperor and favored imperial restoration. Nariaki also greatly expanded the Mitogaku school established by Tokugawa Mitsukuni. He wrote a document entitled "Japan, Reject the Westerners" in 1853. in this document, he stated ten reasons why Japan should stay isolated from the rest of the world. He said that the Japanese people had a choice between war and peace, but clearly to him, the Japanese people should choose war so that Westerners would not intrude into Japan's affairs.

Despite his resistance to Westernization, Nariaki was significantly influenced by the Kokugaku school. Ōkuni Takamasa, a student of Hirata Atsutane attempted to persuade him to combine ritual with technology in order to protect Japan's borders and expand Japan as an empire. This depended on reinvigorating the Japanese "national spirit". Ōkuni and Nariaki therefore laid some foundations for the Meiji restoration as well as the development of State Shinto.

Nariaki and Naosuke fought over who would succeed the Shōgun Iesada, with Nariaki championing his son Yoshinobu. Naosuke, who eventually prevailed, favored the Wakayama Domain daimyo Tokugawa Yoshitomi.

Legacy 
In 1841, Nariaki built Kairaku-en, a garden whose fame lasts to this day.

Nariaki retired in 1844 in favor of his son Yoshiatsu, and died of a heart attack in 1860, at age 60.

Three of the leading figures of the 1860s were in fact natural brothers, all being sons of Nariaki: Hitoshubashi Yoshinobu, who became the 15th and last shōgun as Tokugawa Yoshinobu in 1866; Tokugawa Yoshiatsu of Mito; and Ikeda Yoshinori of Inaba (Tottori).

Family
 Father: Tokugawa Harutoshi
 Mother: Toyama-dono
 Wife: Arisugawa Yoshiko (1804–1893)
1st Son: Tokugawa Yoshiatsu (1832–1868)
2nd Son: Jiromaro (1833–1834) 
5th Daughter: Mihime (1835–1835) 
7th Son: Tokugawa Yoshinobu 
 Concubine: Harigawa-dono
1st Daughter: Masahime (1822–1839)
2nd Daughter: Iromotohime (1825–1826) 
3rd Daughter: Iwaihime (1827–1853) married Yamanobe Yoshimasa 
Concubine: Onao no Kata
 4th Daughter: Hirohime (1834–1835) b
 4th Son: Shiromaro (1835–1836) 
 7th Daughter: Yohime (1837–1843) 
 7th Son: Matsudaira Naoyoshi (1839–1862)
 8th Daughter: Ichiyohime (1840–1843)
 Son: Matsudaira Takeakira (1842–1882) of Hamada Domain 
 13th Son: Yosanmaro (1844–1844) 
Concubine: Sadako
3rd Son: Saburomaro (1835–1837) 
 6th Daughter: Matsuhime (1836–1903) married Nanbu Toshihisa
 5th Son: Ikeda Yoshinari (1837-1877) of Tottori Domain 
 9th Son: Ikeda Mochimasa (1839-1899) of Okayama Domain 
 9th Daughter: Takako (1841-1869) married Date Yoshikuni 
 12th Son: Yonimaro (1844-1844) 
Concubine: Yanagihara-dono
6th Son: Rokuromaro (1837-1838) 
Concubine: Toshiko
12th Daughter: Seihime (1843-1844)
11th son: Kitsuregawa Tsunauji (1844-1874) of Kitsuregawa Domain  
Concubine: Mutsuko
14th Son: Matsudaira Akikuni (1849-1864)
11th Daughter: Tokugawa Sadako (1850-1872) married Prince Arisugawa Taruhito
17th Son: Tsuchiya Shigenao (1854-1904) of Tsuchiura Domain
18th Son: Tokugawa Akitake
20th Son: Tatsumoro (1856-1858)
22nd Son: Matsudaira Yoriyuki (1858-1873) of Moriyama Domain
Concubine: Tokuko 
 15th Son: Yogomaro (1849-1849) 
 16th Son: Matsudaira Tadakazu 
 12th Daughter: Aihime (1852-1914) married Inoue Masayori 
 21st Son: Ichimaru (1856–1856)
Concubine: Michiko
 13th Daughter: Hisahime (1853-1853) 
Concubine: Etsuko
 19th Son: Matsudaira Nobunori
 14th Daughter: Yasuhime (1857-1859) 
 15th Daughter: Masahime (1858–1573)

Works

Published posthumously:
 Kōdōkan ki 弘道館記 (1937). Ed. by Meiji Seitoku Kinen Gakkai 明治聖德記念學會. Tokyo: Meiji Seitoku Kinen Gakkai 明治聖德記念學會.
 Meikun ippanshō 明君一斑抄 (1910–1911). Ed. by Kurokawa Mamichi 黒川真道. Tokyo: Dōbunkan 同文館.

Honours
Senior First Rank (June 27, 1903; posthumous)

Notes

See also 

 Ansei purge

References 
 Beasley, William G. (1955). Select Documents on Japanese Foreign Policy, 1853–1868. London: Oxford University Press. [reprinted by RoutledgeCurzon, London, 2001.   (cloth)]

Further reading 
Kobayashi Kenji 小林健二 (1998). Tokugawa Nariaki to hansharo 徳川斉昭と反射炉. Tokyo: Sōei Shuppan 創栄出版.
Lambeti, Matthew V. (1968). A political study of Tokugawa Nariaki of Mito, 1800–1860. New York: Columbia University. (microfilm)
Ōniwa Kunihiko 大庭邦彦 (1997). Chichi yori Yoshinobu dono e: Mito Nariaki Hitotsubashi Yoshinobu ate shokanshū 父より慶喜殿へ: 水戶斉昭一橋慶喜宛書簡集. Tokyo: Shūeisha 集英社.

External links 
Statue of Nariaki

1800 births
1860 deaths
Lords of Mito
Japanese writers of the Edo period
Critics of Buddhism
Deified Japanese people